Annie Young (died January 22, 2018, age 75) was an American politician and member of the Green Party of Minnesota in Minneapolis, Minnesota. She was an elected at-large member of the Minneapolis Park and Recreation Board. Young ran for Minnesota State Auditor in the 2010 election.

On November 8, 2005, Young, Tom Nordyke, and Mary Merrill Anderson were elected as at-large commissioners of the Minneapolis Park and Recreation Board. She was endorsed by the Green Party of Minnesota. Young ran for re-election in the 2009 Minneapolis municipal election. She was one of two elected Green Party members in the Minneapolis city government; the other is city council member Cam Gordon.

Young, who had been suffering from chronic obstructive pulmonary disease, died on January 22, 2018.

References

External links
Annie Young's Official Park & Recreation Board Site
Annie Young Campaign Site
Annie Young For State Auditor

Year of birth missing
1940s births
2018 deaths
21st-century American politicians
21st-century American women politicians
Candidates in the 2010 United States elections
Minnesota Greens
Women in Minnesota politics
Politicians from Minneapolis